Cole Bardreau (born July 22, 1993) is an American professional ice hockey forward for the Bridgeport Islanders of the American Hockey League (AHL) while under contract to the New York Islanders of the National Hockey League (NHL). He was originally signed as an undrafted free agent by the Philadelphia Flyers on March 12, 2015.

Playing career
While playing for the United States National Team Development Program, Bardreau committed to Cornell University.

In his sophomore season, Bardreau was lent to Team USA to compete at the 2013 World Junior Ice Hockey Championships. Two weeks after returning from winning gold, Bardreau suffered a cervical fracture in his neck while playing at Cornell that caused him to miss the 2012–13 season and the NHL draft. Bardreau spent three months post-surgery in a neck brace with limited activity allowed before slowly being allowed to return to skating six months later. The following season, Bardreau was forced to miss some games to recover from back-to-back MCL tears but was still able to rank fourth on the team with goals.

In his last season at Cornell, Bardreau eclipsed more than 20 points for the first time in his NCAA career. He was named an NCAA (ECAC) Third All-Star Team and NCAA All-Ivy League First Team and awarded the NCAA (ECAC) Best Defensive Forward.

On March 12, 2015, he was signed as an undrafted free agent by the Flyers and played the rest of the 2014–15 season with their American Hockey League affiliate, the Lehigh Valley Phantoms.

The 2015–16 season was Bardreau's first full season in the AHL. Bardreau was forced to miss most of October and November due to an arm and knee injury. Bardreau was named CCM/AHL Rookie of the Month for the month of January after he scored 12 points in 11 games played in January. 

After his sophomore season, Bardreau was forced to miss the Philadelphia Flyers training camp due to abdominal surgery.

On July 15, 2017, Bardreau signed a two-year, two-way contract with the Flyers. However, Bardreau broke his hand in a preseason game against the New York Islanders and started the season on injured reserve. He returned to the lineup on October 25 and recorded five points in six games.

On July 2, 2019, Bardreau signed as a free agent to a two-year, two-way contract with the New York Islanders.

Bardreau's first NHL game came on October 19, 2019, when the New York Islanders were visiting Columbus, Ohio to play the Columbus Blue Jackets. In his first game Bardreau logged 8:54 over 15 shifts. His first NHL point came on October 27, 2019 in Nassau Coliseum against the Philadelphia Flyers. He received the primary assist on Ross Johnston’s goal in the first period. He recorded his first career goal on a penalty shot against the Ottawa Senators on November 5, 2019, which was the game-winning goal in a 4–1 Islanders win. On September 20, 2021, Bardreau was re-signed to a two-year contract by the Islanders.

On December 1, 2022, the New York Islanders announced that they were calling Bardreau up from Bridgeport as one of two forwards to fill in for forwards Kyle Palmieri, Josh Bailey and Cal Clutterbuck while Palmieri was in injured reserve status and Bailey and Clutterbuck were day-to day with injuries.-

International play

Bardreau was named an alternate captain for Team USA at the 2013 World Junior Ice Hockey Championships. Bardreau scored three points in seven games to help lead the team to a gold medal.

Career statistics

Regular season and playoffs

International

References

External links

1993 births
Living people
American men's ice hockey centers
Bridgeport Islanders players
Bridgeport Sound Tigers players
Cornell Big Red men's ice hockey players
Lehigh Valley Phantoms players
New York Islanders players
People from Fairport, New York
Undrafted National Hockey League players
Ice hockey players from New York (state)